Spich station is a railway junction in the district of Spich of the town of Troisdorf in the German state of North Rhine-Westphalia, on the Sieg Railway. It is served by the S12 and S13. Both lines operate at 20-minute intervals, so together they provide a 10-minute interval S-Bahn service to Cologne. It is also served by the S19 service between Düren and Au (Sieg), running hourly and substituting for one of the S13 services. It is classified by Deutsche Bahn as a category 4 station.

The Cologne–Frankfurt high-speed line also passes through Spich, but without stopping.

References 

S12 (Rhine-Ruhr S-Bahn)
S13 (Rhine-Ruhr S-Bahn)
Rhine-Ruhr S-Bahn stations
Railway stations in Germany opened in 1905
Buildings and structures in Rhein-Sieg-Kreis